The Cordell Hull Bridge is a bridge over the Cumberland River in the U.S. state of Tennessee that connects the towns of Carthage and South Carthage.

History
The bridge was built by the Vincennes Bridge Company.  Surveys began in 1933, construction started in December 1934, and the bridge was opened to traffic on May 14, 1936. It was named after Cordell Hull, who served as the 47th United States Secretary of State from 1933 to 1944. The bridge carried Tennessee State Route 25 to its southern terminus at US 70N in South Carthage until 1990 when the route was realigned to a bypass around the northern and eastern edge of town. It was restored in the 2010s, and rededicated on July 2, 2012.

It has been listed on the National Register of Historic Places since November 20, 2009.

It was closed indefinitely on June 8, 2022 after a routine inspection revealed a 24 inch long crack in the truss.  The bridge was reopened to traffic on June 22, 2022 following an inspection by the Tennessee Department of Transportation.

References

External links

Road bridges on the National Register of Historic Places in Tennessee
Bridges completed in 1932
Bridges over the Cumberland River
National Register of Historic Places in Smith County, Tennessee
Steel bridges in the United States
Parker truss bridges in the United States
Buildings and structures in Smith County, Tennessee